is a Japanese screenwriter and novelist focusing on anime productions. His name was written as  until 1987.

Career
He graduated from Waseda University in 1972 and joined to Tatsunoko Production as a story creator and a screenwriter. He left from Tatsunoko in 1975, but he was related to the Time Bokan series, one of the most successful anime series of Tatsunoko, from Time Bokan in 1975 to the last series, Itadakiman in 1983. After leaving from Tatsunoko, he wrote several screenplays such as Dragon Ball and Saint Seiya of Toei Animation.

In parallel with works as screenwriter, he is endeavoring to bring up young talents. In 1986, he found "Anime Scenario House" to train the young anime scenario writers. By 1987, young screenwriters such as Satoru Akahori, Hiroyuki Kawasaki, Katsuyuki Sumisawa, Keiko Nobumoto and Aya Matsui graduated from Koyama's school. The school became Brother Noppo, company to support screenwriters, in 1988.

Koyama authored a remake of Akira Toriyama's Soldier of Savings Cashman manga, that was illustrated by Katsuyoshi Nakatsuru and serialized in V Jump from June 1997 to December 1998.

Works

As chief writer

References

External links 
  
Entry in The Encyclopedia of Science Fiction

1948 births
Living people
Japanese screenwriters
Anime screenwriters
Tatsunoko Production people
People from Akishima, Tokyo
Waseda University alumni